The  Island Bird  is a Chesapeake Bay log canoe, built in 1882, by William Sidney Covington in Tilghman, Maryland. She is a  sailing log canoe with a racing rig, a sharp stem with a longhead bow, and a sharp, raking stern. She is one of the smallest boats in the active racing fleet, with a beam of only . The boat is privately owned by the descendants of Mr. Covington and has been racing every season since 1949.  She one of the last 22 surviving traditional Chesapeake Bay racing log canoes that carry on a tradition of racing on the Eastern Shore of Maryland that has existed since the 1840s. She is located at St. Michaels, Talbot County, Maryland.

She was listed on the National Register of Historic Places in 1985.

References

External links
, including photo in 1984, at Maryland Historical Trust

Ships in Talbot County, Maryland
Ships on the National Register of Historic Places in Maryland
National Register of Historic Places in Talbot County, Maryland